Ningera (Ninggera) is a Papuan language of Sandaun Province, Papua New Guinea.

It is spoken around Ningra ward in Bewani/Wutung Onei Rural LLG, Sandaun Province.

References

Border languages (New Guinea)
Languages of Sandaun Province